Peru is an unincorporated community in Benner Township, Centre County, Pennsylvania, United States. Peru is alternatively known unofficially as Lauvertown. Peru is located northeast of State College and southwest of Pleasant Gap along Pennsylvania Route 26 near the Pennsylvania State Correctional Institution at Rockview.

Demographics

References

Unincorporated communities in Centre County, Pennsylvania
Unincorporated communities in Pennsylvania